Emanuel Phillips Fox (12 March 1865 – 8 October 1915) was an Australian impressionist painter. After studying at the National Gallery of Victoria Art School in Melbourne, Fox travelled to Paris to study in 1886. He remained in Europe until 1892, when he returned to Melbourne and led what is considered the second phase of the Heidelberg School, an impressionist art movement which had grown in the city during his absence. He spent over a decade in Europe in the early 20th century before finally settling in Melbourne, where he died.

Education 
Emanuel Phillips Fox was born on 12 March 1865 to the photographer Alexander Fox and Rosetta Phillips at 12 Victoria Parade in Fitzroy, Melbourne, into a family of lawyers whose firm, DLA Piper still exists. He studied art at the National Gallery of Victoria Art School in Melbourne from 1878 until 1886 under George Folingsby; his fellow students included John Longstaff, Frederick McCubbin, and David Davies, who like him, joined the bohemian Buonarotti Club, and Rupert Bunny.

In 1886, he travelled to Paris and enrolled at the Académie Julian under  William-Adolphe Bouguereau  , where he gained first prize in his year for design, and École des Beaux-Arts (1887–1890), where his masters included Jean-Léon Gérôme, who with Bouguereau was among the most famous artists of the time. While at the Beaux Arts, he was awarded a first prize for painting. He was greatly influenced by the fashionable school of en plein air Impressionism. He exhibited at the Paris Salon in 1890, and returned to Melbourne the same year.

Australia 

In October 1892, Fox opened the Melbourne School of Art with Tudor St. George Tucker, where he taught European ideas and techniques. He had a considerable influence as a teacher on Australian art during this period. In his brief career with the Heidelberg School, Fox was noted for his figure compositions and subdued landscapes, often painted as nocturnes, utilising a low-key palette in which the colours, although limited in range, were related to each other "with the utmost delicacy and inventiveness," to quote Australian artist and art scholar James Gleeson. The emphasis on landscapes may have been at least partly a response to market demand – landscapes found more ready acceptance, and Art Students, a figurative genre painting now recognised as one of his best, first exhibited at the Victorian Artists Society in 1895, remained unsold until 1943.

Europe 

In 1901, he was given a commission under the Gilbee bequest to paint a historical picture of The Landing of Captain Cook for the Melbourne gallery. One of the conditions of the bequest was that the picture must be painted overseas and Fox accordingly left for London. 

He explained his decision to base himself in the European art world in a 1903 letter to Frederick McCubbin: "I am quite certain that the only way is to exhibit alongside the best of the work here, and that one man shows, and colonial or Australian exhibitions in London are of very little good." Both the Royal Academy and the Salon were bastions of establishment art, remote from the modernism of Braque, Picasso and the School of Paris, and Fox's biographer, art historian Ruth Zubans, describes the Salon as celebrating elegance and femininity "...filtered through Impressionist experience and academic training". Fox enjoyed considerable success in Paris and London, becoming in 1894 the first Australian to be awarded a third-class gold medal at the Salon for Portrait of my Cousin (now in the National Gallery of Victoria).

On 9 May 1905, he married the artist Ethel Carrick in St Peter's Church, Ealing. They toured Italy and Spain, then in 1908 settled in Paris, where he was elected an associate of the Société Nationale des Beaux-Arts. He returned to Melbourne on a visit in that year and held a successful one-man show at the Guildhall gallery. Two years later he became a full member of the Société Nationale des Beaux-Arts, the first Australian artist to attain that honour. He was exhibiting regularly at the Royal Academy. In 1912 he was elected a member of the International Society of Painters and in the same year spent some time painting in Spain and Algeria.

Return to Australia 

In 1913, he returned to Australia, marking the occasion with an exhibition of some seventy works. Edith Susan Boyd was one of the main models featured throughout this collection of works. The show was reported with enthusiasm in the local press, the Melbourne Argus writing: "With light and atmosphere always the ruling motive, there is revealed in his themes something of the infinite beauty discoverable in everyday things..." The writer might have had in mind this charming and typical work titled The Arbour.

A final aspect of Fox's oeuvre worth noting are his official commissions. The Landing of Captain Cook at Botany Bay, the most important of these works, holds more than a hint of his teacher Gérôme; and every Australian might be surprised to find that Fox made a copy of Nathaniel Dance's Portrait of Captain Cook, an icon probably so ubiquitous as to have sunk unnoticed but ever-present into the national psyche.

Death
Fox died of cancer in a Fitzroy hospital on 8 October 1915, aged 50. His wife survived him by 36 years, but there were no children. His nephew Leonard Phillips Fox was a prolific writer and pamphleteer for Communist and humanitarian causes.

Critical assessment
When compared with Charles Conder and Sir Arthur Streeton, Fox shows more fascination with the "effects of dappled light" than to the "sunny vistas" one finds in the other two painters' Heidelberg paintings. He is described as an artist who "remained committed to a late nineteenth century aesthetic that paid homage to Impressionism while retaining the tonal values of academic realism".

Paintings

See also
 Nasturtiums (E. Phillips Fox)

References

Further reading
 Eagle, M: The oil paintings of E Phillips Fox in the National Gallery of Australia, National Gallery of Australia, Canberra, 1997 
 Fox, Len, E. Phillips Fox and his family published by the author, 1985 
 Zubans, R., E. Phillips Fox 1865–1915, National Gallery of Victoria, Melbourne, 1994 
 Zubans, R., E. Phillips Fox, His Life and Art, Miegunyah Press, Melbourne, 1995

External links

"E. (Emanuel) Phillips Fox", Gravesite at the Brighton General Cemetery (Victoria)
E. Phillips Fox at the Art Gallery of New South Wales
E. Phillips Fox at the National Gallery of Victoria
A Love Story (1903) , Art Gallery of Ballarat
Biography
Emanuel Phillips Fox at the Art Renewal Center

1865 births
1915 deaths
19th-century Australian painters
20th-century Australian painters
Australian portrait painters
People from Fitzroy, Victoria
Artists from Melbourne
National Gallery of Victoria Art School alumni